Pedlar is an unincorporated community in Monongalia County, West Virginia, United States. Its post office  has been closed.

The community takes its name from nearby Pedlar Run.

References 

Unincorporated communities in West Virginia
Unincorporated communities in Monongalia County, West Virginia